The 2002–03 Southern Illinois Salukis men's basketball team represented Southern Illinois University Carbondale during the 2002–03 NCAA Division I men's basketball season. The Salukis were led by fifth-year head coach Bruce Weber and played their home games at the SIU Arena in Carbondale, Illinois as members of the Missouri Valley Conference. They finished the season 24–7, 16–2 in MVC play to finish as regular season champion. They lost in the championship game of the MVC tournament to Creighton, but still received an at-large bid to the NCAA tournament as No. 11 seed in the Midwest region. The Salukis fell to No. 6 seed Missouri in the opening round.

Roster

Schedule and results

|-
!colspan=12 style=| Non-conference regular season

|-
!colspan=12 style=| Missouri Valley regular season

|-
!colspan=12 style=| Missouri Valley tournament

|-
!colspan=12 style=| NCAA tournament

Rankings

References

2001-02
2002–03 Missouri Valley Conference men's basketball season
Southern Illinois
2002 in sports in Illinois
2003 in sports in Illinois